The George Washington Law Review is a bimonthly law review edited and published by students at the George Washington University Law School. It was established in 1932 and publishes scholarly articles, essays, and student notes. A double issue covers the annual Law Review Symposium. To celebrate its 75th Anniversary in 2006, the review published its inaugural issue of the Annual Review of Administrative Law which has become an annual feature. According to the Journal Citation Reports, the journal has a 2021 impact factor of 1.548.

References

External links
 

American law journals
General law journals
George Washington University Law School
Law journals edited by students
Bimonthly journals
Publications established in 1932
English-language journals